OHHS may refer to:
 Oak Harbor High School (Ohio), Oak Harbor, Ohio, United States
 Oak Harbor High School (Washington), Oak Harbor, Washington, United States
 Oak Hill High School (disambiguation)
 Oak Hills High School, Bridgetown, Ohio, United States
 Olympic Heights Community High School, Boca Raton, Florida, United States
 Oxon Hill High School, Oxon Hill, Maryland, United States